Jadwiga Umińska (28 February 1900 – 10 May 1983) was a Polish painter. Her work was part of the painting event in the art competition at the 1932 Summer Olympics.

References

External links
 

1900 births
1983 deaths
20th-century Polish painters
Polish women painters
Olympic competitors in art competitions
Artists from Warsaw
20th-century Polish women